Karate at the 2020 Summer Olympics was an event held in the 2020 Summer Olympics in Tokyo, Japan. It was the debut appearance of karate at the Summer Olympics. Karate was one of four new sports added to the Olympic program specifically for 2020, rather than as a permanent sport.

The karate competitions at the 2020 Olympics featured eight events. Two karate disciplines were featured: kumite was the sparring discipline and had three weight classes each for men and women; kata was the solo form discipline, and had one event each for men and women. Competitors chose the kata to demonstrate from 102 kata that were recognized by the World Karate Federation. Competitors were not allowed to demonstrate the same kata twice during the tournament. Each event had 10 competitors.

The three weight classes in Olympic competition for kumite were in contrast to the five normally used by the World Karate Federation (WKF). The two lightest (-60kg and -67kg for men, -50kg and -55kg for women) were combined into the Olympic categories of -67kg for men and -55kg for women. The middle categories (-75kg men, -61kg women) were unchanged, while the two heaviest categories (-84kg and +84kg for men, -68kg and +68kg for women) were combined into +75kg for men and +61kg for women.

Rules
For both kumite and kata, WKF rules, effective as of January 2018, have been adopted. In January 2019, a point-based system was adopted for kata.

Kumite
Each match is competed for 3 minutes, unless one competitor amasses eight points more than their opponent. A competitor wins by amassing eight points more than their opponent or by gaining more points than their opponent in the allotted time of 3 minutes. In the event of a tie, the competitor who scored the first point is the winner. In the case of a scoreless bout, the winner will be declared by decision of the five judges.

Scores vary from one to three points. 

 Ippon for 3 points
 Waza-ari for 2 points
 Yuko for 1 point.

Penalties are divided into two categories. If 4 warnings are received in either category, the competitor is disqualified. A competitor can also be disqualified with less than 4 warnings for being deemed an act done maliciously.

Kata
Each of seven judges evaluates the performance individually within the scale of 5.0 to 10.0, in increments of 0.2 for technical points and athletic points respectively. The two highest and two lowest scores out of the seven scores of each group are eliminated and all the remaining scores are added to make up the final scores, which is weighed 70% for technical points and 30% for athletic points. In the case of a draw, the competitors perform an additional choice of kata to be judged.

There are 7 criteria of evaluation for technical points: stances, techniques, transitional movements, timing, correct breathing, focus and conformance. 3 evaluation criteria for athletic points are: strength, speed and balance.

Qualification

There are 80 qualifying spots for karate at the 2020 Summer Olympics.

A nation can have no more than 8 athletes qualify (up to four males and four females) with a maximum of one in each event.

Summary
The 10 competitors in each event qualify as follows:
 1 from the host nation, Japan
 4 from the Olympic Standing ranking as of 5 April 2021
 3 from the Olympics Karate 2020 Qualification Tournament
 2 from continental representation or Tripartite Commission invitation

Because World Karate Federation rankings are based on five weight classes instead of the three weight classes featured in the 2020 Olympics, some of the Olympic events are based on a combination of two WKF classes. In those cases, the top 2 from each of the WKF classes qualify for the combined Olympic class (for a total of 4). Where the Olympic class matches the WKF class, the top 4 in that class qualify.

The qualification tournament features the same weight classes as the Olympic weight classes. Only National Olympic Committees (NOCs) that have not qualified through Olympic standing for a given division are eligible to enter an athlete in the qualification tournament. The top three finishers in each division at the qualification tournament qualify for the Olympics.

A total of 10 quota places, distributed among the eight events, are available through continental representation. The selection order is as follows:

For each continent, all of the gold medalists at the continental games are considered together. The highest ranked among this group earns the qualification spot unless that competitor is already qualified or otherwise cannot be selected without violating any of the following limitations: 10 athletes per division, 1 athlete per NOC per division, 2 athletes per NOC through continental representation (affecting only Africa and the Americas). If the highest-ranked gold medalist cannot be entered, then the next-highest ranked gold medalist qualifies if possible. This process goes through all gold medalists by ranking, then all silver medalists by ranking, then all bronze medalists by ranking until the continent's qualifying spots are filled. If none of the medalists can be entered, the highest-ranked eligible athlete from that continent in the rankings (regardless of finish at the continental games) qualifies.

Participating nations
List of countries competing in Karate.

Schedule

Medalists

Medal table

Men

Women

See also
List of Olympic medalists in karate
Karate at the 2018 Asian Games
Karate at the 2018 Summer Youth Olympics
Karate at the 2019 African Games
Karate at the 2019 European Games
Karate at the 2019 Pan American Games

References

External links
 Complete Results book of Karate Event in Tokyo 2020 Olympic Games 

Karate at the 2020 Summer Olympics
Karate competitions in Japan
2020
2020 Summer Olympics events
Olympics